Count Victor Eugen Felix Voß-Schönau (31 March 1868 – 9 August 1936) was a German count and tennis player in the late 19th century.

Biography 
Count Victor Voss was born on the family estate at Schorssow in today Northeastern Germany to the Hungarian countess Elise Szapáry. At the beginning of the 1890s, he learned to play tennis with the help of an American coach, winning the German Championships three times in a row from 1894 to 1896, which were restricted to German and Austrian citizens at the time. In 1896, he was finalist at the Baden-Baden tournament which he lost to Reginald Doherty.

In 1897 he hired a coach named Thomas Burke (father of Albert Burke) and began to play in tournaments at the Riviera. He reached the final at Nice in 1897 and Monte Carlo in 1898, but lost to Reginald and his brother Laurence Doherty, respectively.

In 1899, Voss traveled to the United Kingdom in order to take part in tournaments there. At the Irish Open, he lost his second round match against Frank Riseley in five sets. At Chiswick Park he lost against George Greville. He reached the final at Nice once again in this year, but lost to Laurence Doherty in three straight sets without winning a single game.

Voss usually played at the tennis facilities at Heiligendamm, where he frequently met with Russian Duchess Anastasia Mikhailovna and countess Clara von der Schulenburg. He used to wrap a wet towel around his forehead while playing, as he said it would prevent his glasses from fogging.

A. Wallis Myers wrote about Voss: "He has a good forehand ground stroke and volleys well, but his service, though hard, is easy to take, he smashes only moderately, and his ground stroke is poor."

After losing to George Hillyard in the semifinals of the 1900 German Championships, Voss retired from playing tennis tournaments. He now focused on his two other hobbies, auto racing and clay pigeon shooting. In 1911, he married a divorced Italian woman at New York. In 1928, he married Countess Clara von der Schulenburg at Berlin-Grunewald. Voss had two children, Paula and Hans-Alexander, with his first wife Francesca Ricci. He died reclusively in his house at Waren in 1936.

References 

1860s births
1936 deaths
German male tennis players
Voss family